= MSG3 =

MSG3 may refer to:

- A variant of the Heckler & Koch G3 German battle rifle
- An overflow feed of the MSG Network that existed in the 1990s
